Sepia simoniana is a species of cuttlefish native to the western Indian Ocean. Its natural distribution stretches from Cape Town to Agulhas Bank, north to northern Kenya and southern Mozambique. It is also present in the Saya-de-Malha Bank. S. simoniana usually lives at depths of less than 100 m, although it has been recorded down to 190 m.

Sepia simoniana grows to a mantle length of 185 mm.

The type specimen was collected off Simon's Bay, South Africa. It is deposited at the Zoologisches Museum in Berlin.

References

External links

Cuttlefish
Molluscs described in 1920
Taxa named by Johannes Thiele (zoologist)